The 47th Pennsylvania House of Representatives District is in southern Pennsylvania and has been represented by Joseph D'Orsie since 2023.

District Profile
The 47th Pennsylvania House of Representatives District is located in York County and includes the following areas:

 Conewago Township
 East Manchester Township
 Hallam
 Hellam Township
 Manchester
 Manchester Township
 Mount Wolf
 Springettsbury Township (part)
 District 02
 District 03
 District 07
 Wrightsville

Representatives

Recent election results

References

External links
District map from the United States Census Bureau
Pennsylvania House Legislative District Maps from the Pennsylvania Redistricting Commission.  
Population Data for District 47 from the Pennsylvania Redistricting Commission.

Government of York County, Pennsylvania
47